Countess Ironing-Maid (German: Gräfin Plättmamsell) is a 1926 German silent comedy film directed by Constantin J. David and starring Ossi Oswalda, Curt Bois, and Robert Garrison.

The film's sets were designed by the art director Rudi Feld.

Cast
 Ossi Oswalda
 Curt Bois
 Robert Garrison
 Lydia Potechina
 Julius Falkenstein
 Hanne Brinkmann
 Hermann Böttcher
 Hugo Fischer-Köppe
 Tamara Geva
 Margarete Kupfer
 Toni Tetzlaff

References

Bibliography
 Bock, Hans-Michael & Bergfelder, Tim. The Concise CineGraph. Encyclopedia of German Cinema. Berghahn Books, 2009.

External links

1926 films
Films of the Weimar Republic
Films directed by Constantin J. David
German silent feature films
German black-and-white films
1926 comedy films
German comedy films
UFA GmbH films
Silent comedy films
1920s German films
1920s German-language films